Khosrovidukht was an Armenian hymnographer and poet who lived during the early 8th century. After her slightly earlier contemporary Sahakdukht, she is the first known woman of Armenian literature and music, and among the earliest woman composers in the history of music. Daughter of the king of Goghtn, her father was killed and she was imprisoned in a fortress of Ani-Kamakh (modern-day Kemah) for twenty years. Her brother was imprisoned and eventually killed; Khosrovidukht's only surviving work, the šarakan "Zarmanali e Ints" ("More astonishing to me") was dedicated to him. Its authenticity has occasionally been doubted, with some scholars attributing it to Sahakdukht. The work did not enter the general repertory of šarakan liturgy but was eventually approved by the Armenian Church for religious use.

Life
Extremely little is known about Khosrovidukht, also spelled as 'Xosroviduxt'. Active in the 8th century, she is recorded as being a member of the royal family. Her father was king , who ruled Goghtn a province of Vaspurakan. Her given name is unknown; the 'dukht'/'duxt' of Xosroviduxt/Khosrovidukht means 'daughter of'. Other names include Khosrovidukht Goghnatsi (Khosrovidukht of Goghtn), Khrosovidoukht Koghtnatsi, and Khosrovidoukht Koghnatsi.

In 708, Khosrov was killed during conflicts in Nakhjavan. Khosrovidukht's brother, was then abducted by Muslim Arabs and brought to Syria, while she was taken to the fortress of Ani-Kamakh, now known as Kemah. She remained there in isolation for twenty years. Her brother converted to Islam, before gaining his freedom years later and returning to Armenia. Vahan then converted back to Christianity and the same Muslims, who considered his abjuration a crime, had him killed. His death was in either 731 or 737. The 1978 Anthology of Armenian poetry reports that Khosrovidukht died in 737 as well, though this is not corroborated in other sources.

Works

The work of Khosrovidukht was not known to scholars until the 19th century. After its discovery, she was recognized as the second (after her earlier contemporary Sahakdukht) woman composer and poet of Armenia. A modern recording of the piece exists, performed by the Sharakan Early Music Ensemble.

The only work attributed to Khosrovidukht is "Zarmanali e Ints" ("Զարմանալի է ինձ"), a šarakan (or sharakan), or a canonical hymn. The title is variously translated as "More astonishing to me", "Wondrous it is to me", and "It is amazing to me". The piece has been described by historian Agop Jack Hacikyan as evidencing "a great deal of literary skill", and by ethnomusicologist Şahan Arzruni as "florid". Like the work of Sahakdukht, Khosrovidukht's piece was not included in the collection of official šarakans; however, despite its secular nature, "Zarmanali e Ints" eventually became approved by the Armenian Church for use in services. Later sources record that the work is dedicated to her brother, following his death. Some scholars, including Ghevont Alishan, Malachia Ormanian and Grigor Hakobian attribute the work to Sahakdukht instead. See  for an English translation of the piece.

References

Notes

Citations

Sources

Further reading
 
 
  This article is essentially a reprint of

External links
  performed by the Sharakan Early Music Ensemble, Armenouhi Seyranyan (singer) and Daniel Yerazhisht (conductor)

8th-century women writers
8th-century poets
8th-century Armenian writers
8th-century Armenian women
8th-century women composers
Armenian composers
Women composers
Armenian nobility
Christian hymnwriters
Women hymnwriters
Armenian women poets
Medieval Armenian woman writers